Mbegha was the first "Lion King" (Shambala language: Simba Mwene) of the Shambaa people, modern-day Northeastern Tanzania, who lived during the first half of the 18th century. While his existence is undisputed among historians, his biography is mainly based on oral traditions. Numerous legends have made him a mythic hero. 

Mbegha was born to the Ngulu people from the hilly area of the Nguru Mountains. Because of disputes with relatives and because considered supernaturally dangerous, he was condemned from his homeland. He fled to Kilindi, where he became a hunter, hunting bush pigs with the local chief's son. While on a hunt, the chief's son was accidentally killed. In order to escape punishment from the chief, Mbegha had to flee again, this time further north into the Usambara Mountains. He lived in the open near a place called Ziai, in caves and camps, hunting wild animals. 

Upon learning that Mbegha was a skilled pig hunter, the locals asked him to rid their village of pigs, which kept on destroying their agricultural produce. He killed all pigs and was welcomed by the Shambaa. He was invited to live in Vuga, near modern-day Bumbuli, then chief town of the Shambaa people. Mbegha also helped the people of Vuga and all the other villages and was awarded with the kingship. He became known as a lion slayer after killing a lion on the way to their village. The grateful farmers gave him wives from each major clan and the respective firstborn sons were placed in charge of all clans, thereby also forging regional unity.

Mbegha was the founder of the Kilindi dynasty. Mbegha's son Buge grew to become the chief of Vuga and when Mbegha died, Buge succeeded him as king.
Buge's son Kimweri ye Nyumbai ruled the kingdom at its greatest extent. After he died there was a succession struggle, and in 1890 the Germans took control and started colonizing the former kingdom.

See also 

 History of Tanzania

References 
 John Iliffe: A modern history of Tanganyika, University of Cambridge, 1979
 Jan Vansina: Oral tradition as history, James Currey Publishers, 1985, pages 141-142  
 Steven Feierman: The Shambaa Kingdom: A History, University of Wisconsin, 1974
 Philip Briggs: Bradt Tanzania: With Zanzibar,m Pemba & Mafia, Bradt Travel Guides, 2006, pages 234-235

Shambaa people
Tanzanian chiefs
Precolonial Tanzania
Tanga, Tanzania
Tanga